

Unprotected cruisers 
  (1860)
 
  (1861)
  (1861)
  (1862)
  (1862)
  (1869)

  (1866)
  (1866)
  (1867)
  (1867)
  (1867)
  (1868)
  (1867)

  (1871)
  (1874)
  (1872)
  (1872)

  (1869)
  (1874)
  (1874)

  (1869)
  (1869)
  (1869)
  (1869)
  (1869)
  (1870)
  (1872)
  (1872)
  (1872)
  (1872)
  (1869)

 (1876)
 (1877)
  (1873)
 
  (1876) – struck 1901
  (1876) – struck 1901
 
  (1877) – wrecked 1898
  (1879)
  (1880)
  (1882)
 
  (1879)
  (1879)
  (1880)
  (1882)
  (1881) - struck 1901
  (1881)
  (1882)
  (1884)
  (1885)

Torpedo cruisers

  (1885)
  (1886)
  (1887)
  (1889)

  (1891)
  (1893)

 (1892)
 (1894)
 (1895)

Protected cruisers

  (1884) – struck 1906
  (1886) – struck 1910
  (1888) – scrapped 1919

  (1889) – struck 1910
  (1893) – struck 1906
 
  (1888) – scrapped 1921
  (1888) – struck 1906
  (1888) – struck 1921
 
  (1888) – struck 1908
  (1889) - struck 1922
  (1889) - struck 1912
 
  (1889) – hulked 1911
  (1889) – sunk 1907
  (1891) – struck 1914
 
  (1893) – struck 1920
  (1893) 
  (1893) – struck 1907
 
  (1894) - struck 1910
  (1896) - struck 1911
  (1897) – struck 1920
 
  (1894) – struck 1920
  (1895) - struck 1911
 
  (1896) - struck 1914
  (1895) - struck 1921
  (1896) – struck 1924

 
  (1896) - struck 1911
  (1898) - struck 1910
  (1896) - sold to Poland 1927; struck 1942
  (1897) – struck 1922
  (1898) – sunk 1917
 
  (1897) – struck 1922
  (1899) – ran aground 1910
  (1899) – struck 1922

Armoured cruisers 
  (1890)
 
  (1893) – sunk by torpedo 1916
  (1894) – scrapped in 1920
  (1894) – sunk 1907
  (1892) – scrapped 1926
  (1895) – scrapped 1929
  – scrapped 1934
 
  (1899) – sunk 1944
  (1900) – scrapped 1943
  (1901) – sunk by torpedo 1918
 
  – scrapped 1922
  (1901) – scrapped 1927
  (1902) – sunk by mine 1917

 
 
 
  (1901) – sunk 1905
  (1902)
  (1902)
 
  (1901) – torpedoed 1915
  (1903) – struck 1927
  (1904) – scrapped 1930
  (1905)
  (1906) – struck 1931

 
  (1907) – struck 1930
  (1908) – destroyed 1943

Light cruisers
  (1912) – (ten planned but not ordered)
 Mulhouse (1920) – struck 1933
  (1920)
 Colmar (1920)
 Strasbourg (1920)
 Thionville (1920)
 
  (1923) – scrapped 1952
  (1924) – sunk 12 January 1945
  – burnt out after Naval Battle of Casablanca, 8 November 1942.
  – scrapped 1966
  (1933) – struck 1959
 
  (1933) – scuttled 27 November 1942, salvaged by Italian Navy in 1943 as FR 12, sunk by bombing 18 August 1944. 
  (1935)– scuttled 27 November 1942, salvaged by Italian Navy in 1943 as FR 11, wrecked by bombing 24 November 1943.
  – scuttled 27 November 1942.
  – scrapped 1958
  (1933) – hulked 1958 and scrapped 1970
  (1936) – scrapped 1959
 
  (1946) – scrapped 1976
 Châteaurenault - cancelled 1939
 Guichen - cancelled 1939
  (1948) – scrapped 1979
  (1948) – scrapped 1982
  (1956) – scrapped 2016

Heavy cruisers 
 
  (1925) – scrapped 1955
  (1926) – scrapped 1962
 
  (1927) – scrapped 1974
  – scuttled 1942
  (1929) – scuttled 1942, scrapped 1943
  (1930) – scuttled 1942
  (1932) – scuttled 1942
  (1939) – (six planned but not ordered)
 Saint-Louis
 Henri IV
 Charlemagne
 Brennus
 Charles Martel
  Vercingetorix

Helicopter cruisers 
  (1961) – decommissioned 2010

Notes and references

Cruiser
France